{{DISPLAYTITLE:C21H20O12}}
The molecular formula C21H20O12 (molar mass: 464.37 g/mol, exact mass: 464.095476 u) may refer to:

 Hyperoside
 Isoquercetin
 Myricitrin, a flavonol
 Spiraeoside, a flavonol

Molecular formulas